Sinp'yŏng County is a county in North Hwanghae province, North Korea. The Mannyon mine is located at Mannyon-rodongjagu.

Administrative divisions
Sinp'yŏng county is divided into 1 ŭp (town), 2 rodongjagu (workers' districts) and 11 ri (villages):

Transportation 
Sinpyong County has a trolleybus line in Mannyon-rodongjagu. The line closed in early 2000s and has been partially dismantled since then, but still has a complete network of poles on the south side of the road.

References 

Counties of North Hwanghae